The 2002 American Le Mans Series season was the 32nd season for the IMSA GT Championship, and the fourth under the American Le Mans Series banner.  It was a series for Le Mans Prototypes (LMP) and Grand Touring (GT) race cars divided into 4 classes: LMP900, LMP675, GTS, and GT.  It began March 16, 2002 and ended October 12, 2002 after 10 races.

Schedule
Following the demise of the European Le Mans Series, the North American schedule was greatly expanded to ten races.  Several temporary street courses were added in cities such as Miami, Florida and Washington D. C., while the Portland International Raceway and Texas Motor Speedway did not return, leaving the ALMS without any road course ovals on the schedule.  Circuit Trois-Rivières joined Mosport as a second Canadian event, and Road America was also scheduled for the first time.

Season results

Overall winner in bold.

Teams Championship

Points are awarded to the finishers in the following order:
 25-21-19-17-15-14-13-12-11-10-...
Exceptions being for the 12 Hours of Sebring and Petit Le Mans which awarded in the following order:
 30-26-24-22-20-19-18-17-16-15-...

Cars failing to complete 70% of the winner's distance are not awarded points.  Teams only score the points of their highest finishing entry in each race.

LMP900 Standings

LMP675 Standings

GTS Standings

GT Standings

External links
 American Le Mans Series homepage
 IMSA Archived ALMS Results and Points

American Le Mans
Le Mans
American Le Mans Series seasons